This is a list of Viceroys of Grenada from the establishment of French rule in 1649 until its independence from the United Kingdom in 1974. Following independence, the viceroy of Grenada ceased to represent the British monarch and British government, and ceased to be a British person, instead the new vice regal office, renamed to Governor-General of Grenada represented (and to this day, represents) the Monarch of Grenada, and the person holding the office must be a Grenadian citizen.

French governors of Grenada (1649–1762)

British governors of Grenada (1762–1802) 
In 1763, the Treaty of Paris ceded Grenada to the United Kingdom.

 George Scott, 1762–1764
 Robert Melville, 1764, acting, first time
 Ulysses FitzMaurice, 1764–1770, first time
 Robert Melville, 1770–1771, second time
 Ulysses FitzMaurice, 1771, second time
 William Leybourne, 1771–1775
 William Young, 1776
 The Lord Macartney, 1776–1779
 Jean-François, comte de Durat, 1779–1783, Governor-General, (French occupation)
 Edward Mathew, 1784–1785
 William Lucas, 1785–1787, acting
 Samuel Williams, 1787–1788, acting, first time
 James Campbell, 1788–1789, acting
 Samuel Williams, 1789–1792, acting, second time
 Ninian Home, 17 November 1792 – 1795
 Kenneth Francis Mackenzie, 1795, acting
 Samuel Mitchell, 1795–1796, acting
 Alexander Houstoun, 1796–1797
 Charles Green, 30 September 1797 – 1801
 Samuel Dent, 1801–1802, acting

Lieutenant governors of Grenada (1802–1882) 
In 1802, the Governor of Grenada was replaced by a lieutenant governor, subordinate to the Governor of Barbados.

 George Vere Hobart, 1802–5 November 1802
 Thomas Hislop, 1803–1804
 William Douglas MacLean Clephane, 1803
 Frederick Maitland, 29 March 1805 – 1811
 Abraham Charles Adye, 1811–1812
 George Robert Ainslie, 1812–1813
 Charles Shipley, 1813–1815, acting
 George Paterson, 1815–1816, acting, first time
 Phineas Riall, 1816–1823
 George Paterson, 1823–1826, acting, second time
 James Campbell, 1826–1833

In 1833, Grenada was incorporated into the British Windward Islands along with Barbados, St. Lucia, Saint Vincent, and the Grenadines.  The Governor of Barbados retained overall responsibility for Grenada with the Lieutenant Governor of Grenada as his subordinate.

 George Middlemore, 1833–1835
 John Hastings Mair, 1835–1836
 Carlo Joseph Doyle, 1836–1846
 Ker Baillie Hamilton, 1846–1853
 Robert William Keate, 1853–1857
 Cornelius Hendricksen Kortright, 1857–1864
 Robert Miller Mundy, 1864–1871
 Sanford Freeling, 1871–1875
 Cyril Clerke Graham, 1875–1877
 Robert William Harley, 1877–1882

Administrators of Grenada (1882–1967) 
In 1882, the role of the Lieutenant Governor of Grenada was replaced by that of an administrator.  The administrator remained subordinate to the Governor of Barbados.  In 1885, Barbados left the administrative control of the Windward Islands.  A new Governor of the Windward Islands was appointed, with his seat in Grenada.  The Administrator of Grenada remained a subordinate position concerned with matters local to Grenada itself.

 Irwin Charles Maling, 1882, first time
 Roger Tuckfield Goldsworthy, 1882–1883
 Edward Laborde, 1883–1886, first time
 Irwin Charles Maling, 1886–1887, second time
 Henry Rawlins Pipon Schooles, 1887–1888
 John Elliott, Jun 1888 – Dec 1888  
 Robert Baxter Llewelyn, Dec 1888 – Jan 1889, first time
 Edward Laborde, Jan 1889 – Nov 1889, second time
 Robert Baxter Llewelyn, Nov 1889 – Sep 1890, second time
 Lawrence Riky Fyfe, Sep 1890 – Nov 1890
 Edward Rawle Drayton, 1890–1915
 Herbert Ferguson, 1915–1930
 Hilary Rudolph Robert Blood, 1930–1935
 William Leslie Heape, 1935–1940
 Charles Henry Vincent Talbot, 1940–1942
 George Conrad Green, 1942–1951
 Wallace MacMillan, 1951–1957
 James Monteith Lloyd, 1957–1962
Between 1958 and 1962, Grenada was part of the short-lived Federation of the West Indies.
 Lionel Achille Pinard, 1962–1964
 Ian Turbott, 1964–1967

Governors of Grenada (1967–1974) 
On 3 March 1967, Grenada became an Associated State of the United Kingdom, responsible for its own internal affairs.  A governor was again appointed as the United Kingdom's official representative.

 Ian Turbott, 1967–1968
 Dame Hilda Bynoe, 1968 – 21 January 1974 
 Sir Leo de Gale, 24 January 1974 – 7 February 1974, acting

On 7 February 1974, Grenada achieved independence from Great Britain.  After independence, the vice regal office in Grenada became the office of the Governor-General of Grenada.

References
 http://www.rulers.org/rulg2.html#grenada
 http://www.worldstatesmen.org/Grenada.html
 The Grenada Handbook, Directory and Almanac, 1897, London: Sampson Low, Marston, pp. 83–86

Lists of office-holders in Grenada
British Grenada people
Grenada
List